Paul Beckers (1 November 1878 – 27 April 1965) was a German comedian ("Fliegentüten-Heinrich") and actor. He appeared in more than 35 films between 1917 and 1936.

Selected filmography
 Der Fliegentüten-Heinrich (1917)
 Fliegentüten-Heinrich als Don Juan (1918)
 Heinrich sucht eine Lieblingsfrau (1920)
 The Heath Is Green (1932)
 Dream of the Rhine (1933)
 The Valiant Navigator (1935)
 Pillars of Society (1935)

References

External links

1878 births
1965 deaths
German male film actors
20th-century German male actors
Actors from Magdeburg